Óscar Sánchez may refer to:

Oscar Sánchez (footballer, born 1955), Guatemalan football striker
Óscar Sánchez (wrestler) (born 1967), Spanish Olympic wrestler
Óscar Sánchez (footballer, born 1971), Bolivian football sweeper
Óscar Sánchez (footballer, born 1979), Spanish football leftback
Óscar Eduardo Sánchez (born 1985), Colombian cyclist
Óscar Sánchez (footballer, born 1989), Mexican football midfielder
Oscar Sánchez (Chilean footballer)
Oz Sanchez, American Paralympic handcyclist and triathlete

See also
Oscar Flores Sánchez (1907–1986), Mexican politician
Óscar Gómez Sánchez (1934–2008), Peruvian footballer